Sts. Ingenuin and Albuin Church is a Catholic church located in the village of Koroška Bela, in the municipality of Jesenice in northwestern Slovenia. The church is dedicated to St. Ingenuin and St. Albuin, bishops of Säben Abbey from the 6th and 10th centuries respectively.

History

The predecessor of the current building was a Gothic church also dedicated to the two saints, as is the chapel of nearby Bled Castle, which dates from roughly the same time frame. Consecration was on 26 April 1361; the altar of Saint Acacius was dedicated the next year by John, bishop of Urbin and papal vicar general.

Due to defilement of the church by Turkish raiders, the altar was reconsecrated on 2 October 1486 by Ljubljana bishop Žiga the noble Lambergar. In 1584, during the Reformation, local Lutherans came into conflict with ecclesiastical authorities, some confrontations apparently taking place in the church. The protestant minority was subsequently expelled from the area.

In 1691, the church was granted special rights. By 1752, the building had grown dilapidated as well as too small, and a decision was reached to replace it, with what would become the present church. Experts believe the architect was one Matija Perski. Collection of funds began immediately; loans were extended by the churches at Blejska Dobrava, Rečica (now part of Bled), and Kupljenik pod Babjim Zobom. In addition to popular contributions, the then-parish church in Jesenice made a gift. The ironworking facilities in Javornik were unable to help due to their own difficulties.

The old church was demolished in 1754; the year is marked on the keystone of the main portico. Construction took seven years, and was sufficiently far along that consecration was planned for the feast of St. Peter and St. Paul of 1761 when - two days beforehand, on 27 June 1761 - the entire village of 60 houses burned down, including the church.

Reconstruction took ten years; the new church was finally consecrated on 3 September 1771 by Ljubljana Bishop Johann Karl von Herberstein. In 1788, the church was granted greater privileges.

Due to another disaster, a massive landslide in 1789, furnishing the new church had to be deferred. The only new element commissioned was the baroque altar of St. Ahac, kept fairly modest due to circumstances. Records describe it as a humble wooden structure with statues of the two patron saints in niches, and an oil painting of the saints before lake Bled overhead.

The side altar of the Virgin of the Rosary was the work of Ignacij Arer (1776, restored around 1867). The ceiling was decorated by an unknown artist in 1828, but required repairs by 1858, performed by painter Matevž Goričnik. The 16-station Way of the Cross was the work of Alojzij Goetzl from Kranj. An organ was purchased from Kropa manufacturer Ignac Zupan, but was - due to poor quality - replaced in 1893 by a Gorščič organ, still there today. In 1875, the Koroška Bela parish was established, as a suffragan of Jesenice parish; St. Ingenuin and St. Albuin's became the parish church. 

Amid the effort to equip it properly, however, the church was struck by another calamity: on June 2, 1875, the building was struck by lightning, killing the priest Valentin Plemlj and starting a fire which destroyed the bell tower and roof. The village spent several years making external repairs, then returned to the project of beautifying the interior. In 1903 the current altar painting was purchased, the work of the artist Kaestner from Tirol. In 1906, the old and damaged wooden altar was replaced with a marble one carved by A. Rovšek of Ljubljana, and marble communion tables were added. 

In 1916, due to the need for raw materials for the war effort, Austro-Hungarian soldiers removed the bells; one year later, on August 14, 1917, the village and church were badly damaged and set alight by an Italian air raid. The extent of the devastation was such that it took six years to rebuild the bell tower, and longer to fix the roof. Some of the repairs were temporary, with decades needed before a permanent fix; other traces of damage were never fully addressed and are still evident.

To date, the tower and roof have had to be rebuilt four times each.

During the 1920s, the interior frescoes were repainted by Matej Sternen. The current bells were blessed on 16 November 1986, while the facade of the church was restored in 1990. The fifth consecration of the altar of St. Ahac was on February 8, 1998.

References 

Municipality of Jesenice
18th-century Roman Catholic church buildings in Slovenia
Roman Catholic churches completed in 1771